Roslynn Renee Mauskopf (born February 7, 1957 in Washington, D.C.) is an American lawyer and jurist serving as a United States district judge of the United States District Court for the Eastern District of New York and the director of the Administrative Office of the United States Courts. She previously served as the chief judge of the United States District Court for the Eastern District of New York from 2020 to 2021 and as the United States Attorney for the Eastern District of New York from 2002 to 2007.

Education 

Mauskopf earned a Bachelor of Arts degree from Brandeis University in 1979 and a Juris Doctor from the Georgetown University Law Center in 1982.

Career 

Prior to her appointment, Mauskopf as the United States attorney for the Eastern District of New York from 2002 to 2007. Before that, Mauskopf served as the inspector general of New York from 1995 to 2002.

Mauskopf began her legal career in 1982 as an assistant District attorney in the New York County District Attorney's Office, a position she held until her appointment as inspector general in 1995. Among other positions in the office, Mauskopf served as chief of the Frauds Bureau.

Federal judicial service 
She entered service as a United States district judge in the Eastern District of New York in October 2007. Mauskopf was nominated by President George W. Bush on January 9, 2007 upon the recommendation of New York Governor George Pataki (R-NY). On October 4, 2007, the United States Senate confirmed Mauskopf by unanimous consent and she received her commission on October 18, 2007. She became chief judge on January 26, 2020, after Dora Irizarry assumed senior status, and served in that capacity until February 1, 2021.

Administrative Office of the United States Courts 
After the retirement of Director James C. Duff on December 31, 2020, on January 5, 2021, Chief Justice John Roberts appointed Mauskopf to be the next director of the Administrative Office of the United States Courts effective February 1, 2021.

References

External links 
 
  May 16, 2008 New York Post article about Judge Mauskopf's induction ceremony

|-

1957 births
Living people
21st-century American judges
21st-century American women judges
Brandeis University alumni
Georgetown University Law Center alumni
Judges of the United States District Court for the Eastern District of New York
People from Washington, D.C.
State cabinet secretaries of New York (state)
United States Attorneys for the Eastern District of New York
United States district court judges appointed by George W. Bush
Women in New York (state) politics